The Lower Moreland Township School District is a public school district in Montgomery County, Pennsylvania. The school district serves the Township of Lower Moreland, a Philadelphia suburb of about 11,000 people. There are three schools: Pine Road Elementary School (K-5), Murray Avenue School (6-8), and Lower Moreland High School.

Administration 
 Superintendent: Dr. Scott Davidheiser
 Director of Curriculum, Instruction, and Professional Development:  Julien Drennan
 Director of Special Education: Frank Giordano
 Business Manager: Mark McGuinn
 Director of Technology: Dr. Jason Hilt
 Director of Human Resources/Public Relations:  Cheryl Galdo

Lower Moreland High School 

Principal:  William Miles; Assistant Principals: Justin Thomas, Megan Geenens; Athletic Director: Danielle Turner.

 School mascot: Lion
 School rival: Various – Springfield Township, Holy Ghost Prep, New Hope-Solebury, Bristol

The Lower Moreland High School houses 741 students in grades 9 through 12.

Lower Moreland High School THON is a non-profit organization where the students of Lower Moreland High School come together to raise money for the four diamonds fund, a fund that sponsors a four diamond family who has a child fighting cancer, so they never have to see a bill in the child's' medical treatment. The LMHS THON is a smaller version of the dance marathon at Penn State. Most of the money comes from students raising it or companies that have donated it. Lower Moreland High School THON started in 2008. THON lasts for 12 hours or more, (since it is consistently changing and improving) where the students constantly are standing and are kept occupied by games and competitions so that the time goes by quickly.

Music program
The Lower Moreland Music High School music program has various bands, orchestras, and choirs:
 Symphonic Band: consists of all band students in grade 10 through 12.
 Wind Ensemble: a tryout ensemble for LMHS
 Jazz Lab: an ensemble for jazz enthusiasts who are in the process of learning jazz techniques and styles before moving onto the Jazz Ensemble
 Jazz Ensemble: a tryout ensemble at LMHS for jazz enthusiasts

Murray Avenue School 
Principal: Ms. Jennifer Dilks, Assistant Principal: Mr. Erin Stroup The Murray Avenue School houses students in grades 6 through 8.

Pine Road Elementary School 
Principal: Mr. Scott Cole, Assistant Principal: Mrs. Kaitlyn McMullan.

The Pine Road School houses students in grades Kindergarten through 5. The fourth and fifth grades were transferred from the crowded Murray Avenue School to the Pine Road School at the end beginning of the 2010–2011 school year after the completion of the construction of a new wing.

Notable alumni 
 Valerie Plame, CIA operative
 Jill Kelley, Lebanese-American socialite
 Katie Walder is an American actress
 Rod J. Rosenstein, United States Deputy Attorney General
 Harry Elfont, writer and director.
Dina Gusovsky, journalist and comedy writer

References 

School districts in Montgomery County, Pennsylvania